Into the Blue is the third studio album by American indie rock duo Broken Bells. It was released October 7, 2022, through AWAL.

Background and recording
Broken Bells first started teasing new material in 2018, showing photos of the two recording in the studio and eventually releasing the non-album singles "Shelter" and "Good Luck". Into the Blue was the band's first studio album since 2014's After the Disco, marking the longest gap between studio albums to date.

Release
The album's first single, "We're Not in Orbit Yet..." was released June 29 2022 to positive critical reception, with Stereogum writer Chris DeVille calling it "a bit like cosmic soul crossed with chamber-pop". A followup single, "Saturdays", was released August 10. Mxdwn.com writer Federico Cardenas said the first two singles "[show] both a great diversity in terms of songwriting and tone, while developing a clear theme in the style and aesthetic they intend to portray in Into the Blue." A third and final single, "Love on the Run", was released September 21.

Critical reception
Into the Blue was met with generally favorable reviews from listeners and music critics. At Metacritic, which assigns a normalised rating out of 100 to reviews from mainstream publications, the album received an average score of 75, based on 7 reviews. Aggregator AnyDecentMusic? gave it 7.3 out of 10, based on their assessment of the critical consensus. In a favorable review for Mojo, Stevie Chicks said the album "finds their bond as strong as ever" and compared certain songs to the sounds of Isaac Hayes and the Beatles.

Track listing

Personnel
Broken Bells
 James Mercer
 Danger Mouse

Production
 Danger Mouse

Charts

References

2022 albums
Broken Bells albums
Albums produced by Danger Mouse (musician)